The Blowing Rocket is a weekly newspaper in Blowing Rock, North Carolina, United States. In 2002 the Rocket had a paid circulation of 3,530.

History
The newspaper was created as a tabloid by state Senator Columbus Vance Henkel, Jr., in June 1932. During the 1930s and 1940s it was a seasonal newspaper, published only during the months of June, July and August. Each summer a student at the University of North Carolina at Chapel Hill School of Journalism was hired to edit the Rocket.

In the 1950s the Rocket switched to broadsheet format and a year-round publication schedule. In 1956 the Rocket was acquired by Rivers Printing Company, which owned the Watauga Democrat in Boone.

Today the Rocket is part of Jones Media's High Country Media group, which includes the Watauga Democrat, The Avery Journal and the Mountain Times.

The Blowing Rocket has the distinction of being the last newspaper affiliated with the National Press Association to charge 10 cents for an individual copy. The Epitaph in Tombstone, Arizona raised its price from 10 cents to 25 cents in 1982, shortly before the Rocket took the same step.

See also
 List of newspapers published in North Carolina

References

External links
 A History of Local Media in the Watauga Democrat's 2005 supplement, A Place Called Home
 The Watauga Democrat
 The Blowing Rocket
 The Avery Journal
 The Mountain Times
 Jones Media Publications

Weekly newspapers published in North Carolina
Watauga County, North Carolina